Jess Phoenix (born 1982) is an American TV personality and former Democratic candidate who ran for the U.S. House of Representatives. Phoenix is the co-host on the Discovery series Hunting Atlantis.

Early life and education 
Phoenix grew up in Colorado, USA, with two parents who are FBI agents. She holds a Bachelor of Arts degree in history from Smith College and a master's degree in geology from California State University, Los Angeles, with a thesis titled Lava Flow Morphologies and Structural Features Along the Axis of the South Rift Zone of Loihi Seamount, Hawaii. Phoenix later enrolled in a PhD program with the School of Earth and Atmospheric Sciences at Queensland University of Technology in Australia studying Mexico's Sierra Madre Occidental range but withdrew after falling out with her PhD advisor.

Books 
Phoenix has written a memoir titled Ms. Adventure: My Wild Explorations in Science, Lava, and Life published by Timber Press, a division of Workman Publishing Group 2021. The book was nominated as a finalist for the 2022 AAAS/Subaru SB&F Prize for Excellence in Science Books in the category of Young Adult Science.

Media 
Phoenix has appeared in the Discovery series Trailblazers in 2016, Devil Sharks  in 2017, appeared in Science Channel's series What on Earth? in 2015, and in 2021 was a co-host with Stel Pavlou on the Discovery series Hunting Atlantis.Hunting Atlantis has been criticized by scientists from the archaeology, anthropology, and history communities for pseudoscience and misrepresenting history and archaeology for entertainment purposes.

Political career 
Phoenix was a candidate in the 2018 election to represent California in the US House of Representatives in the 25th Congressional District in California. She lost in the Democratic primary on June 5, 2018, finishing in fourth place with 6.4% of the vote.

Personal life 
Phoenix is married to Carlos Peláez. They both changed their last names to Phoenix in 2012.  Together they founded Blueprint Earth, a volunteer-based non-profit focused on cataloging the ecosystem in one square kilometer of the Mojave Desert.

References

External links

American women television presenters
California State University, Los Angeles alumni
Smith College alumni
1982 births
Living people
Television personalities from Colorado
Candidates in the 2018 United States elections
California Democrats